Seo Ji-yeon ( or  ; born 3 March 1993) is a South Korean right-handed sabre fencer, two-time Olympian, and a 2021 team Olympic bronze medalist.

Medal Record

Olympic Games

World Championship

Asian Championship

Grand Prix

World Cup

References

1993 births
Living people
People from Seoul
Fencers from Seoul
Sportspeople from Seoul
South Korean sabre fencers
South Korean female fencers
Olympic fencers of South Korea
Fencers at the 2016 Summer Olympics
Fencers at the 2010 Summer Youth Olympics
Fencers at the 2020 Summer Olympics
Medalists at the 2020 Summer Olympics
Olympic medalists in fencing
Olympic bronze medalists for South Korea